This is a list of people elected Fellow of the Royal Society in 1937.

Fellows 

John Desmond Bernal
Albert Charles Chibnall
George Roger Clemo
Sir Alan Nigel Drury
Harold Munro Fox
William Edward Garner
Sydney Goldstein
Percival Hartley
Herbert Leader Hawkins
John Ernest Holloway
William Hume-Rothery
Thomas Godfrey Mason
James Reid Moir
Sir Marcus Laurence Elwin Oliphant
Carl Frederick Abel Pantin
Sir David Randall Pye
Edmund Clifton Stoner

Foreign members

Schack August Steenberg Krogh
Otto Fritz Meyerhof
Henry Norris Russell

Statute 12 

Alexander Augustus Frederick William Alfred George Cambridge, Earl of Athlone

1937
1937 in science
1937 in the United Kingdom